Until the founding of the Supreme Court of Judicature at Fort William in 1774, the Mayor's Courts in Madras, Calcutta and Bombay were the East India Company's highest courts in British India. It was established by Charter of 1726.

See also
Judiciary of India

References

High Courts of India
British East India Company
Legal history of India